Mansa Devi Temple, dedicated to the Hindu goddess Mansa Devi, may refer to:

 Mata Mansa Devi Mandir, Haryana
 Mansa Devi Temple, Haridwar
 Shri Mansa Mata Mandir Hasampur